Lanarkite is a mineral, a form of lead sulfate with formula Pb2(SO4)O. It was originally found at Leadhills in the Scottish county of Lanarkshire, hence the name.  It forms white or light green, acicular monoclinic prismatic crystals, usually microscopic in size. It is an oxidation product of galena.

References

Webmineral
Mindat

Lead minerals
Sulfate minerals
Monoclinic minerals
Minerals in space group 12